David R. Craig (born June 12, 1949) is an American Republican Party politician from the State of Maryland who unsuccessfully sought the Republican nomination for Governor of Maryland in 2014. He was appointed, and sworn in as Harford County Executive on July 7, 2005. Craig was elected in 2006 and re-elected in 2010. Craig previously served in the Maryland State Senate in 1995–99 representing Harford County and in 1990-94 in the Maryland House of Delegates. He was also elected Mayor of Havre de Grace from 1985 to 1989 and 2001 to 2005. David was a teacher and assistant principal in the Harford County Public School System for thirty-four years.

Early life and education

Craig was born in 1949 in Havre de Grace, Maryland to Joseph E. Craig (1917–2011). He graduated Havre de Grace High School in 1967, and obtained a B.S. in History from Towson University in 1971 and a Master's degree from Morgan State University.

Personal life
Craig married his high-school sweetheart; Melinda Lee Blevins, in 1971. They have three children and nine grandchildren.

Teaching career
Craig spent thirty-four years in the Harford County Public School System as a teacher and assistant principal. He began teaching in 1971 at Edgewood Junior High School. He then taught at Havre de Grace Community School for seven years, and later at Magnolia Middle School, Aberdeen High School, and Edgewood High School.

Political career

Local government
Craig began his political career serving on the Havre de Grace City Council beginning in 1979 he was elected to 3 consecutive 2 year terms. He was elected Mayor of Havre de Grace from 1985 to 1989 and 2001 to 2005. He resigned upon swearing in as the Harford County Executive.

Maryland House of Delegates
Craig was elected to the Maryland House of Delegates in 1990, representing District 34 (Harford County). He was a member of the following committees: Constitutional and Administrative Law Committee, 1991–92; Ways and Means Committee, 1992-93 (education subcommittee); Commerce and Government Matters Committee, 1994. Vice-Chair, Harford County Delegation, 1993.

Maryland State Senate
Craig was then elected to the Maryland Senate in 1994 and served until 1999, representing District 34 (Harford County). He was a member of the following committees: Joint Committee to Study Mandates on Local Government, 1995–97; Economic and Environmental Affairs Committee, 1995–99 (education subcommittee; health subcommittee); Executive Nominations Committee, 1995–99; Joint Committee on Legislative Ethics, 1995–99; Joint Committee on Protocol. Chair, Harford County Delegation, 1998-99.

Harford County Executive
Craig ran for Harford County Executive in 1998 against then-Delegate James Harkins. Harkins defeated Craig in the Republican Primary and was subsequently re-elected in 2002. Harkins resigned as County Executive to become Director of Maryland Environmental Service in 2005, and Craig was appointed by the County Council to fulfill the term. Craig was then elected as County Executive in 2006 and 2010. As Mayor of Havre de Grace, Craig was elected President of the Maryland Municipal League(MML) in 2005, and in 2010 as County Executive, he was elected by his peers as President of the Maryland Association of Counties (MACo). He is the first elected official to have served as President of both organizations.

2014 Maryland gubernatorial candidacy

David Craig announced his candidacy for Governor of Maryland on July 3, 2013. His position platform included phasing out the income tax in Maryland. He was defeated by Larry Hogan in the Republican gubernatorial primary on June 24, 2014.

Election results
2006 Race for Harford County Executive - Harford County
Voters to choose one:
{| class="wikitable"
!Name
!Votes
!Percent
!Outcome
|-
|- 
|David R. Craig, Rep.
|46,121
|  52%
|   Won
|-
|-
|Ann C. Helton, Dem.
|42,442
|  47.9%
|   Lost
|-
|Write-In's
|75
|  0.1%
|   Lost
|}

1998 Race for Harford County Executive - Harford County - Republican Primary
Voters to choose one:
{| class="wikitable"
!Name
!Votes
!Percent
!Outcome
|-
|- 
|James Harkins, Rep.
|8,324
|  56%
|   Won
|-
|-
|David R. Craig, Rep.
|6,378
|  43%
|   Lost
|-
|-
|Vedell Pace, Rep.
|184
|  1%
|   Lost
|}

1994 Race for Maryland State Senate – District 34 - Harford County
Voters to choose one:
{| class="wikitable"
!Name
!Votes
!Percent
!Outcome
|-
|- 
|David R. Craig, Rep.
|17,444
|  54%
|   Won
|-
|-
|Habern W. Freeman, Dem.
|14,676
|  46%
|   Lost
|-
|}

1990 Race for Maryland House of Delegates – District 34 - Harford County
Voters to choose three:
{| class="wikitable"
!Name
!Votes
!Percent
!Outcome
|-
|- 
|Rose Mary Hatem Bonsack, Dem.
|13,373
|  19%
|   Won
|-
|-
|Mary Louise Preis, Dem.
|13,045
|  19%
|   Won
|-
|- 
|David R. Craig, Rep.
|12,031
|  18%
|   Won
|-
|- 
|William H. Cox Jr., Dem.
|10,296
|  15%
|   Lost
|-
|- 
|David M. Meadows, Rep.
|10,069
|  15%
|   Lost
|-
|- 
|Cecil W. Wood, Rep.
|9,840
|  14%
|   Lost
|}

Legacy
The David Craig Park on Saint John Street in Havre de Grace was named after him.

References

External links
 David R. Craig, County Executive, Harford County, Maryland

1949 births
Living people
Schoolteachers from Maryland
American school administrators
State cabinet secretaries of Maryland
Harford County Executives
Mayors of Havre de Grace, Maryland
Republican Party Maryland state senators
Republican Party members of the Maryland House of Delegates
Morgan State University alumni
Towson University alumni